The 2012–13 Butler Bulldogs men's basketball team represented Butler University in the 2012–13 NCAA Division I men's basketball season. Their head coach was Brad Stevens, serving his 6th year. The Bulldogs played their home games at Hinkle Fieldhouse, which has a capacity of approximately 10,000. This was the first year that Butler competed in the Atlantic 10 Conference, as they moved from the Horizon League following the 2011–12 season.  The Bulldogs returned all but three players, including Chase Stigall, who was a part-time starter in 2011-2012, and Roosevelt Jones, who "was a top flight recruit and did not disappoint [with] 7.8 points and a team high 6.0 rebounds last season."

They finished the season 27–9, 11–5 in A-10 play to finish in a three-way tie for third place. They advanced to the semifinals of the Atlantic 10 tournament where they lost to Saint Louis. They received an at-large bid to the 2013 NCAA tournament where they defeated Bucknell in the second round before losing in the third round to Marquette.

2012–13 was Butler's first and only season in the Atlantic 10 as they joined the so-called Catholic 7, along with Creighton and Xavier, in the new incarnation of the Big East Conference in July 2013.

Off season
The Bulldogs left the Horizon League, of which it had been a founding member in 1979.  The move to the Atlantic 10 Conference was announced on May 29, 2012, after earlier plans to move for the 2013–14 season were accelerated.  Athletic Director Barry Collier explained, "Since announcing our intention to depart after 2012-13, Butler and the Horizon League have discussed the terms for next season.  Ultimately, it was in our best interest to reach an agreement with the Horizon League for immediate departure."  ESPN reported the move was because the Bulldogs "weren't going to be allowed to play in the [Horizon League conference tournament] so the choice was obvious – bolt to the A-10."  ESPN further contended that "They will compete for the regular-season and conference tournament titles."

Over the summer, Butler added statistician Drew Cannon to the coaching staff.  According to Sports Illustrated, it was "the first pure statistics-based hire" in college basketball.

Regarding the team's potential success for the 2012–13 season, ESPN analyst Eamonn Brennan posited, "It's fair to expect a drastic uptick in perimeter efficiency from this offense, and the same baseline defensive strength. If that's the case, there's no reason this group can't make a run at its first A-10 title in its very first opportunity."  Jon Rothstein of CBS New York noted "The Bulldogs are much better suited to make the jump to the Atlantic 10 with [Roosevelt Jones] in their starting lineup. With brute strength and burgeoning point forward skills, Jones showed flashes of brilliance as a freshman, accumulating four double-doubles during the course of Butler’s season. Expect that number to at least double in 12-13."

On September 12, Coach Stevens announced junior guard Chrishawn Hopkins was dismissed from the team for violation of team rules.  "I am sorry to have to announce that Chrishawn Hopkins has been dismissed from our team," he said. "We consider it a privilege to represent Butler University as a member of our team. With that privilege, comes a requirement and responsibility to meet the standard of our team rules. Dismissal is the consequence of a failure to do so." Hopkins, who was one of four returning starters, played in all 37 games during the 2011–12 season including 24 as a starter. Hopkins was expected to be the starting point guard.  Two months later, Chris Harrison-Docks quit the team prior to the first regular season game.

Departures

2012 recruiting class
ESPN included Butler's 2012 recruiting class among its top recruiting classes from teams in non-BCS conferences, noting recruit Kellen Dunham was listed as an ESPN Top 100 recruit and is "a sniper to run off screens and create movement in the halfcourt sets for the next four years."  In addition to Kellen Dunham, ESPN listed Devontae Morgan as "a playmaking combo guard" and Chris Harrison-Docks as a "more prototypical point."  ESPN gave the class an overall grade of B+, tied as the second highest rating among teams in the Atlantic 10.

In ESPN's scouting report, Kellen Dunham was listed as the 78th best overall player, due in large part to the fact that what he "does really well is shoot the basketball.  How he goes about his business is akin to a master craftsman applying his trade. Dunham is in constant motion, working to get himself in position to score and he's typically shot-ready."   Dunham's reputation as an excellent shooter was further emphasized by Rivals listing him as the best shooter among all recruits of non-BCS teams.   Devontae Morgan's scouting report from ESPN listed him as "a combination guard that is a excellent open court passer especially in draw and kick situations... Morgan is also a very capable of defending both guard positions as well."  Finally, ESPN's scouting report lists Chris Harrison-Docks as "a tough competitor, dogged defender and unafraid of taking contact in the paint off penetration when driving into the lane for creative finishes" and further states that "He is a winner and the type of point guard you want on a championship level team."

Also new to the team in the 2012–13 season is transfer Rotnei Clarke, a guard from Oklahoma who sat out the 2011–12 season after transferring from Arkansas.  Clarke is considered one of the season's top 50 players, in large part because of his 3-point shot, which averaged 43% in his last season at Arkansas.  Clarke is held, along with Dunham, as a potential solution to Butler's struggles during the previous season.  "Butler shot 27.2 percent from 3-point range; only four teams in Division I were worse. Fortunately, help is on the way. Arkansas transfer Rotnei Clarke, who averaged 43 percent from 3 and scored 15.2 points per game as a junior, is eligible to compete this fall, and Indiana native Kellen Dunham is a top-100 recruit known for one trait above all else: prodigious outside shooting. It's fair to expect a drastic uptick in perimeter efficiency from this offense, and the same baseline defensive strength. If that's the case, there's no reason this group can't make a run at its first A-10 title in its very first opportunity."

Awards

Roster

Barlow started the year as a walk-on but was granted a scholarship for the second semester.

Regular season

Schedule

|-
!colspan=12 style="background:#13294B; color:#FFFFFF;"| Exhibition

|-
!colspan=12 style="background:#13294B; color:#FFFFFF;"| Regular Season

|-
!colspan=12 style="background:#13294B; color:#FFFFFF;"| Atlantic 10 Conference Play

|-
!colspan=12 style="background:#13294B; color:#FFFFFF;"| Atlantic 10 Tournament

|-
!colspan=12 style="background:#13294B; color:#FFFFFF;"| 2013 NCAA Tournament

Awards

Clarke injury
During the game at Dayton on January 12, Rotnei Clarke was fouled in mid-air by Dayton's Matt Derenbecker and was thrown head-first into the base of the backboard support. "Clarke remained down on the court for almost eight minutes before being taken off the floor via stretcher, flashing a thumbs up to the crowd as he left." Before leaving the court, Clarke was overheard initially saying "I can't move" before reporting numbness in his hands. Clarke later recalled, "I feel blessed to be walking. When I hit my head, I rolled over and I couldn’t feel anything from my neck down. That’s what scared me the most. My body was just tingling."   Clarke gave a "thumbs-up" sign as he was wheeled off the court en route to Miami Valley Hospital where it was confirmed he had a sprained neck, no fractures, and no spinal cord damage. Derenbecker was assessed a flagrant foul. After the game, Derenbecker described his interaction with Butler's Coach Stevens during the post-game handshake:  "I said 'Coach, please tell Rotnei it was not on purpose.' And he said, 'Matt, I know it wasn't on purpose. Don't worry.' It felt good to know that a coach of his caliber was able to realize that it wasn't a dirty play."

Rankings

References

Butler Bulldogs Men's
Butler Bulldogs men's basketball seasons
Butler
Butl
Butl